UFC 50: The War of '04 was a mixed martial arts event held by the Ultimate Fighting Championship on October 22, 2004, at the Trump Plaza in Atlantic City, New Jersey. The event was broadcast live on pay-per-view in the United States, and later released on DVD.

History
Headlining the card were Tito Ortiz and Patrick Côté. Côté was a late replacement for Lion's Den fighter Guy Mezger, who pulled out of the event after being taken to the hospital due to stroke-like symptoms. Patrick Côté was moved from the undercard to the main event.

The event included another episode of "On The Mat", teaching the Kimura. This event was also featured on the first season of The Ultimate Fighter.

This event became notable due to the announcement of the reality-based series The Ultimate Fighter by Dana White, which premiered in January the following year.

Results

See also 
 Ultimate Fighting Championship
 List of UFC champions
 List of UFC events
 2004 in UFC

References

External links
UFC official website

Ultimate Fighting Championship events
2004 in mixed martial arts
Mixed martial arts in New Jersey
Sports competitions in Atlantic City, New Jersey
2004 in sports in New Jersey